Camilla Rosatello (born 28 May 1995) is an Italian tennis player.

She has a career-high singles ranking of world No. 225, achieved on 7 August 2017. On 29 January 2018, she peaked at No. 134 in the doubles rankings. Rosatello has won one singles title and 34 doubles titles on the ITF Women's Circuit.

On the ITF Junior Circuit, she had a career-high combined ranking of 30, achieved in January 2013.

Rosatello has represented Italy in Fed Cup competition, where she has a win–loss record of 0–1.

ITF Circuit finals

Singles: 12 (1 title, 11 runner–ups)

Doubles: 60 (34 titles, 26 runner–ups)

Notes

References

External links
 

1995 births
Living people
Italian female tennis players
People from Saluzzo
Sportspeople from the Province of Cuneo
21st-century Italian women